The third season of Braxton Family Values, an American reality television series, was broadcast on WE tv. The series aired from March 14, 2013 until February 20, 2014, consisting of 26 episodes. 

Its executive producers were Toni Braxton, Tamar Braxton, Vincent Herbert, Dan Cutforth, Jane Lipsitz, Julio Kollerbohm, Michelle Kongkasuwan, Lauren Gellert, Annabelle McDonald and Sitarah Pendelton.

Season 3 averaged 1.4 million viewers.

Production
Braxton Family Values was officially renewed for its third season in July 2012, announced by WE tv. A teaser trailer for the season was released on WE tv's YouTube channel on February 28, 2013. The third season returned on November 14, 2013, following its four-month hiatus.

Episodes

References

External links

 
 
 

2013 American television seasons
2014 American television seasons